TRST is the debut studio album by Canadian electronic music project TR/ST. Self-produced by the band, it was released on February 28, 2012 by Arts & Crafts Productions. The record features "gloomy synth-pop" and "fully-fleshed dark wave" sounds that have been described as "a combination of gothic rock and trance pop."

Critical reception

Upon its release, TRST received generally positive reviews from music critics. At Metacritic, which assigns a normalized rating out of 100 to reviews from critics, the album received an average score of 71, which indicates "generally favorable reviews", based on 13 reviews.

The critics described the music on the album as synth-pop, dark wave, EBM and industrial dance.

Consequence of Sound critic Alex Young thought that the band is "crafty enough to pack TRST with enough of their own quirks and curveballs to make for a surprisingly fresh debut, one that'll likely prove difficult to follow." Daniel Slyvester of Exclaim! stated that the album "comes off less conceptual and more song-based than their image suggests," and added: "The truth is Trust are masters of delivery and flawless executioners, proving to be much better mechanics than designers." musicOMH's Tim Lee called the record "a hell of a debut" and "a reminder that as ubiquitous as they may become, there's plenty of life in the old synth yet."

NMEs Kevin "EG" Perry was also positive in his assessment, stating: "Cool kids Trust never want to be seen to be trying too hard, but finale ‘Sulk’ is where it all comes together, like Chromatics with an evil glint in their eye." Benjamin Boles of Now praised the band's stylistic combination of goth rock and trance pop. Pitchforks Larry Fitzmaurice wrote: "While the amount of raw material here may be daunting for some, there are plenty of surprising melodic moments to indulge in."

Nevertheless, Matt James of PopMatters was more mixed in his assessment of the album, describing it as "a sharp 'n' smartly entertaining synth-noir debut yet it falls just shy of hitting the truly big numbers."

Track listing

Personnel
Credits adapted from the liner notes of TRST.

TR/ST
 Robert Alfons – performance, production ; mixing 
 Maya Postepski – performance, production ; mixing

Additional personnel
 Emily Lazar – mastering
 Heba Kadry – mastering
 Damian Taylor – mixing

Artwork
 Mikey Apples – artwork, layout
 Robert Alfons – photography, artwork, layout

Release history

References

External links
 

2012 debut albums
Arts & Crafts Productions albums
Trust (Canadian band) albums